C. A. Kurian (20 January 1933 – 20 March 2021) was an Indian trade union leader, legislator, and leader of the Communist Party of India. He was the Chair of Deputy Speaker in the 10th Kerala Legislative Assembly. He was first elected to the 5th Kerala Legislative Assembly in 1977 from Peermade constituency. He represented the same constituency in the 6th and 10th Kerala Legislative Assembly. He was a bank employee before entering politics in 1960; Detained for 17 months in Viyur Central Jail during 1965-66 and also imprisoned for 27 months for different periods.

He died on 20 March 2021 aged 88.

Political career
CPI State Executive Committee; State Secretary, 
AITUC; General Secretary, All India Plantation Workers Federation;

References 

Kerala MLAs 1970–1977
Communist Party of India politicians from Kerala
1933 births
2021 deaths
Trade unionists from Kerala